A.T.'s Delight is an album by American drummer Art Taylor recorded and released in 1960, his only recording as a leader for Blue Note.

Reception

The Allmusic review by Steve Leggett awarded the album 4 stars and stated "A.T.'s Delight is a solid outing, with a wonderfully nervous but completely focused energy".

Track listing
 "Syeeda's Song Flute" (John Coltrane) – 6:35
 "Epistrophy" (Kenny Clarke, Thelonious Monk) – 6:52
 "Move" (Denzil Best) – 5:49
 "High Seas" (Kenny Dorham) – 6:49
 "Cookoo and Fungi" (Art Taylor) – 5:33
 "Blue Interlude" (Dorham) – 5:22

Personnel
Art Taylor – drums
Dave Burns – trumpet (tracks 1-4 & 6)
Stanley Turrentine – tenor saxophone
Wynton Kelly – piano (tracks 1-4 & 6)
Paul Chambers – bass
Carlos "Patato" Valdes – conga (tracks 2, 3 & 5)

References

Blue Note Records albums
Art Taylor albums
1960 albums
Albums recorded at Van Gelder Studio
Albums produced by Alfred Lion